Stuart W. Cooper (born 1942) is an American filmmaker, actor and writer.

Career
Cooper was a resident in the United Kingdom in the 1960s and 1970s where his most notable film appearance was as one of The Dirty Dozen, Roscoe Lever, in 1967. His other film roles included I'll Never Forget What's'isname (1967) as one of Oliver Reed's film crew, and Subterfuge (1968) starring Gene Barry and Joan Collins.

Overlord, his 1975 WWII collage docudrama, originally failed to get US theatrical distribution and was only shown there in select screenings and on television (including a run on California's Z Channel in 1982, which was highlighted in the acclaimed 2004 TV documentary film Z Channel: A Magnificent Obsession).

Accolades
His 1974 film Little Malcolm was entered into the 24th Berlin International Film Festival, where it won the Silver Bear. The following year, Overlord won the Silver Bear – Special Jury Prize at the 25th Berlin Festival.

Filmography

As director

As actor

References

External links
 

1942 births
Living people
American male film actors
Film producers from New Jersey
American male screenwriters
American expatriates in England
Writers from Hoboken, New Jersey
Alumni of RADA
Film directors from New Jersey
Screenwriters from New Jersey
Collage filmmakers